Niall Campbell Ferguson FRSE (born 18 April 1964) is a Scottish-American historian based in the United States who is the Milbank Family Senior Fellow at the Hoover Institution at Stanford University and a senior fellow at the Belfer Center for Science and International Affairs at Harvard University. Previously, he was a professor at Harvard University, the London School of Economics, New York University, a visiting professor at the New College of the Humanities, and a senior research fellow at Jesus College, Oxford.

Ferguson writes and lectures on international history, economic history, financial history and the history of the British Empire and American imperialism. He holds positive views concerning the British Empire. He once ironically called himself "a fully paid-up member of the neo-imperialist gang" following the 2003 invasion of Iraq. In 2004, he was one of Time magazine's 100 most influential people in the world. Ferguson has written and presented numerous television documentary series, including The Ascent of Money, which won an International Emmy award for Best Documentary in 2009. 

Ferguson has been a contributing editor for Bloomberg Television and a columnist for Newsweek. He began writing a twice-a-month column for Bloomberg Opinion in June 2020.

Early life
Ferguson was born in Glasgow, Scotland, on 18 April 1964 to James Campbell Ferguson, a doctor, and Molly Archibald Hamilton, a physics teacher. Ferguson grew up in the Ibrox area of Glasgow in a home close to the Ibrox Park football stadium. He attended The Glasgow Academy. He was brought up as, and remains, an atheist, though he has encouraged his children to study religion and attends church occasionally.

Ferguson cites his father as instilling in him a strong sense of self-discipline and of the moral value of work, while his mother encouraged his creative side. His maternal grandfather, a journalist, encouraged him to write. He has described his parents as "both very much products of the Scottish Enlightenment." Ferguson ascribes his decision to read history at university instead of English literature to two main factors: Leo Tolstoy's reflections on history at the end of War and Peace (which he read at the age of fifteen), and his admiration of historian A. J. P. Taylor.

University of Oxford
Ferguson received a demyship (highest scholarship) from Magdalen College, Oxford. Whilst a student there, he wrote a 90-minute student film The Labours of Hercules Sprote, played double bass in a jazz band "Night in Tunisia", edited the student magazine Tributary, and befriended Andrew Sullivan, who shared his interest in right-wing politics and punk music. He had become a Thatcherite by 1982. He graduated with a first-class honours degree in history in 1985.

Ferguson studied as a Hanseatic Scholar in Hamburg and Berlin in 1987 and 1988. He received his Doctor of Philosophy degree from the University of Oxford in 1989: his dissertation was titled Business and Politics in the German Inflation: Hamburg 1914–1924.

Career

Academic career
In 1989, Ferguson worked as a research fellow at Christ's College, Cambridge. From 1990 to 1992 he was an official fellow and lecturer at Peterhouse, Cambridge.  He then became a fellow and tutor in modern history at Jesus College, Oxford, where in 2000 he was named a professor of political and financial history. In 2002 Ferguson became the John Herzog Professor in Financial History at New York University Stern School of Business, and in 2004 he became the Laurence A. Tisch Professor of History at Harvard University and William Ziegler Professor of Business Administration at Harvard Business School. From 2010 to 2011, Ferguson held the Philippe Roman Chair in history and international affairs at the London School of Economics. In 2016 Ferguson left Harvard to become a senior fellow at the Hoover Institution, where he had been an adjunct fellow since 2005.

Ferguson has received honorary degrees from the University of Buckingham, Macquarie University (Australia) and Universidad Adolfo Ibáñez (Chile). In May 2010, Michael Gove, education secretary, asked Ferguson to advise on the development of a new history syllabus, to be entitled "history as a connected narrative", for schools in England and Wales. In June 2011, he joined other academics to set up the New College of the Humanities, a private college in London.

In 2018, Ferguson apologized after fellow historians criticized him for only inviting white men as speakers to a Stanford conference on applied history.

Also in 2018, emails documenting Ferguson's attempts to discredit a progressive activist student at Stanford University who had been critical of Ferguson's choices of speakers invited to the Cardinal Conversations free speech initiative were released to the public and university administrators. He teamed with a Republican student group to find information that might discredit the student. Ferguson resigned from leadership of the program once university administrators became aware of his actions. 

Ferguson responded in his column saying, "Re-reading my emails now, I am struck by their juvenile, jocular tone. "A famous victory," I wrote the morning after the Murray event. 'Now we turn to the more subtle game of grinding them down on the committee. The price of liberty is eternal vigilance.' Then I added: 'Some opposition research on Mr O might also be worthwhile'—a reference to the leader of the protests. None of this happened. The meetings of the student committee were repeatedly postponed. No one ever did any digging on "Mr O". The spring vacation arrived. The only thing that came of the emails was that their circulation led to my stepping down."

Business career

In 2000, Ferguson was a founding director of Boxmind, an Oxford-based educational technology company.

In 2006, he set up Chimerica Media Ltd., a London-based television production company.

In 2007, Ferguson was appointed as an investment management consultant by GLG Partners, to advise on geopolitical risk as well as current structural issues in economic behaviour relating to investment decisions. GLG is a UK-based hedge fund management firm headed by Noam Gottesman. Ferguson was also an adviser to Morgan Stanley, the investment bank.

In 2011, he set up Greenmantle LLC, an advisory business specializing in macroeconomics and geopolitics.

He also serves as a non-executive director on the board of Affiliated Managers Group.

Political involvement
Ferguson was an advisor to John McCain's U.S. presidential campaign in 2008, supported Mitt Romney in his 2012 campaign and was a vocal critic of Barack Obama.

Non-profit organisation
Ferguson is a trustee of the New-York Historical Society and the London-based Centre for Policy Studies.

Career as a commentator, documentarian and public intellectual
Ferguson has written regularly for British newspapers and magazines since the mid 1980s. At that time, he was lead writer for The Daily Telegraph, and a regular book reviewer for The Daily Mail.

In the summer of 1989, while travelling in Berlin, he wrote an article for a British newspaper with the provisional headline "The Berlin Wall is Crumbling", but it was not published.

In the early 2000s he wrote a weekly column for The Sunday Telegraph and Los Angeles Times, leaving in 2007 to become a contributing editor to the Financial Times. Between 2008 and 2012 he wrote regularly for Newsweek.  Since 2015 he has written a weekly column for The Sunday Times and The Boston Globe, which also appears in numerous papers around the world.

Ferguson's television series The Ascent of Money won the 2009 International Emmy award for Best Documentary. In 2011 his film company Chimerica Media released its first feature-length documentary, Kissinger, which won the New York Film Festival's prize for Best Documentary.

Television documentaries
 Empire: How Britain Made the Modern World (2003)
 American Colossus (2004)
 The War of the World (2006)
 The Ascent of Money (2008)
 Civilization: Is the West History? (2011)
 Kissinger (2011)
 China: Triumph and Turmoil (2012)
 The Pity of War (2014)
 Networld (2020)

BBC Reith Lectures

In May 2012, the BBC announced Niall Ferguson was to present its annual Reith Lectures. These four lectures, titled The Rule of Law and its Enemies, examine the role man-made institutions have played in the economic and political spheres.

In the first lecture, held at the London School of Economics, titled The Human Hive, Ferguson argues for greater openness from governments, saying they should publish accounts which clearly state all assets and liabilities.  Governments, he said, should also follow the lead of business and adopt the Generally Accepted Accounting Principles and, above all, generational accounts should be prepared on a regular basis to make absolutely clear the inter-generational implications of current fiscal policy.  In the lecture, Ferguson says young voters should be more supportive of government austerity measures if they do not wish to pay further down the line for the profligacy of the baby boomer generation.

In the second lecture, The Darwinian Economy, Ferguson reflects on the causes of the global financial crisis, and allegedly erroneous conclusions that many people have drawn from it about the role of regulation, and asks whether regulation is in fact "the disease of which it purports to be the cure".

The Landscape of Law was the third lecture, delivered at Gresham College.  It examines the rule of law in comparative terms, asking how far the common law's claims to superiority over other systems are credible, and whether we are living through a time of "creeping legal degeneration" in the English-speaking world.

The fourth and final lecture, Civil and Uncivil Societies, focuses on institutions (outside the political, economic and legal realms) designed to preserve and transmit particular knowledge and values.  Ferguson asks whether the modern state is quietly killing civil society in the Western world, and what non-Western societies can do to build a vibrant civil society.

The first lecture was broadcast on BBC Radio 4 and the BBC World Service on Tuesday, 19 June 2012.  The series is available as a BBC podcast.

Books

The Cash Nexus
In his 2001 book, The Cash Nexus, which he wrote following a year as Houblon-Norman Fellow at the Bank of England, Ferguson argues that the popular saying, "money makes the world go 'round", is wrong; instead he presented a case for human actions in history motivated by far more than just economic concerns.

Empire: How Britain Made the Modern World
In his 2003 book, Empire: How Britain Made the Modern World, Ferguson conducts a provocative reinterpretation of the British Empire, casting it as one of the world's great modernising forces. The Empire produced durable changes and globalisation with steampower, telegraphs, and engineers.

Bernard Porter, famous for expressing his views during the Porter–MacKenzie debate on the British Empire, attacked Empire in The London Review of Books as a "panegyric to British colonialism". Ferguson, in response to this, drew Porter's attention to the conclusion of the book, where he writes: "No one would claim that the record of the British Empire was unblemished. On the contrary, I have tried to show how often it failed to live up to its own ideal of individual liberty, particularly in the early era of enslavement, transportation and the 'ethnic cleansing' of indigenous peoples." Ferguson argues however that the British Empire was preferable to German and Japanese rule at the time:

The 19th-century empire undeniably pioneered free trade, free capital movements and, with the abolition of slavery, free labour. It invested immense sums in developing a global network of modern communications. It spread and enforced the rule of law over vast areas. Though it fought many small wars, the empire maintained a global peace unmatched before or since. In the 20th century too the empire more than justified its own existence. For the alternatives to British rule represented by the German and Japanese empires were clearly – and they admitted it themselves – far worse. And without its empire, it is inconceivable that Britain could have withstood them.

The book was the subject for a documentary series on British television network Channel 4.

Colossus: The Rise and Fall of the American Empire 
In his 2005 book, Colossus: The Rise and Fall of the American Empire, Ferguson proposes that the United States aspires to globalize free markets, the rule of law, and representative government, but shies away from the long-term commitments of manpower and money that are indispensable, in taking a more active role in resolving conflict arising from the failure of states. The U.S. is an empire in denial, not acknowledging the scale of global responsibilities. The American writer Michael Lind, responding to Ferguson's advocation of an enlarged American military through conscription, accused Ferguson of engaging in apocalyptic alarmism about the possibility of a world without the United States as the dominant power and of a casual disregard for the value of human life.

War of the World

In War of the World, published in 2006, Ferguson argued that a combination of economic volatility, decaying empires, psychopathic dictators, racially/ethnically motivated and institutionalised violence resulted in the wars and genocides of what he calls "History's Age of Hatred". The New York Times Book Review named War of the World one of the 100 Notable Books of the Year in 2006, while the International Herald Tribune called it "one of the most intriguing attempts by an historian to explain man's inhumanity to man". 

Ferguson addresses the paradox that, though the 20th century was "so bloody", it was also "a time of unparalleled [economic] progress". As with his earlier work Empire, War of the World was accompanied by a Channel 4 television series presented by Ferguson.

The Ascent of Money
Published in 2008, The Ascent of Money examines the history of money, credit, and banking. In it Ferguson predicts a financial crisis as a result of the world economy and in particular the United States using too much credit. He cites the China–United States dynamic which he refers to as Chimerica where an Asian "savings glut" helped create the subprime mortgage crisis with an influx of easy money.

Civilization
Published in 2011, Civilization: The West and the Rest examines what Ferguson calls the most "interesting question" of our day: "Why, beginning around 1500, did a few small polities on the western end of the Eurasian landmass come to dominate the rest of the world?" 

The Economist in a review wrote: In 1500 Europe's future imperial powers controlled 10% of the world's territories and generated just over 40% of its wealth. By 1913, at the height of empire, the West controlled almost 60% of the territories, which together generated almost 80% of the wealth. This stunning fact is lost, he regrets, on a generation that has supplanted history's sweep with a feeble-minded relativism that holds "all civilisations as somehow equal".

Ferguson attributes this divergence to the West's development of six "killer apps", which he finds were largely missing elsewhere in the world in 1500 – "competition, the scientific method, the rule of law, modern medicine, consumerism and the work ethic".

Ferguson compared and contrasted how the West's "killer apps" allowed the West to triumph over "the Rest" citing examples. Ferguson argued the rowdy and savage competition between European merchants created far more wealth than did the static and ordered society of Qing China. Tolerance extended to thinkers like Sir Isaac Newton in Stuart England had no counterpart in the Ottoman Empire, where Takiyuddin's state built observatory was eventually demolished due to political conflict. This ensured that Western civilization was capable of making scientific advances that Ottoman civilization never could. Respect for private property was far stronger in British America than it ever was in Spanish America, which led to the United States and Canada becoming prosperous societies while Latin America was and remains mired in poverty.

Ferguson also argued that the modern West had lost its edge and the future belongs to the nations of Asia, especially China, which has adopted the West's "killer apps". Ferguson argues that in the coming years we will see a steady decline of the West, while China and the rest of the Asian nations will be the rising powers.

A related documentary Civilization: Is the West History? was broadcast as a six-part series on Channel 4 in March and April 2011.

Kissinger: 1923–1968: The Idealist
Kissinger The Idealist, Volume I, published in September 2015, is the first part of a planned two-part biography of Henry Kissinger based on his private papers. The book starts with a quote from a letter which Kissinger wrote in 1972. The book examines Kissinger's life from being a refugee and fleeing Nazi Germany in 1938, to serving in the US army as a "free man" in World War II, to studying at Harvard. The book explores the history of Kissinger joining the Kennedy administration and later becoming critical of its foreign policy, to supporting Nelson Rockefeller on three failed presidential bids, to joining the Nixon administration. The book includes Kissinger's early evaluation of the Vietnam war and his efforts to negotiate with the North Vietnamese in Paris.

Historians and political scientists gave the book mixed reviews. The Economist wrote in a review about The Idealist:  "Mr Ferguson, a British historian also at Harvard, has in the past sometimes produced work that is rushed and uneven. Not here. Like Mr Kissinger or loathe him, this is a work of engrossing scholarship." In a negative review of The Idealist, the American journalist Michael O'Donnell questioned Ferguson's interpretation of Kissinger's actions leading up to Nixon's election as President. 

Andrew Roberts praised the book in The New York Times, concluding: "Niall Ferguson already has many important, scholarly and controversial books to his credit. But if the second volume of "Kissinger" is anywhere near as comprehensive, well written and riveting as the first, this will be his masterpiece."

The Square and the Tower
In 2018's The Square and the Tower, Ferguson proposed a modified version of group selection that history can be explained by the evolution of human networks.  He wrote, "Man, with his unrivaled neural network, was born to network."  The title refers to a transition from hierarchical, "tower" networks to flatter, "square" network connections between individuals. John Gray in a review of the book was not convinced.  He wrote, "He offers a mix of metaphor and what purports to be a new science." 

"Niall Ferguson has again written a brilliant book," wrote Deirdre McCloskey in The Wall Street Journal, "this time in defence of traditional top-down principles of governing the wild market and the wilder international order. The Square and the Tower raises the question of just how much the unruly world should be governedand by whom. Not everyone will agree, but everyone will be charmed and educated. ... "The Square and the Tower" is always readable, intelligent, original. You can swallow a chapter a night before sleep and your dreams will overflow with scenes of Stendhal's "The Red and the Black," Napoleon, Kissinger. In 400 pages you will have restocked your mind. Do it."

Doom: The Politics of Catastrophe
In this book Ferguson offers a global history of disaster. Damon Linker of the New York Times argues that the book is "often insightful, productively provocative and downright brilliant" and suggests that Ferguson displays "an impressive command of the latest research in a large number of specialized fields, among them medical history, epidemiology, probability theory, cliodynamics and network theory". However Linker also criticises the book's "perplexing lacunae".

In a review for The Times, David Aaronovitch described Ferguson's theory as "nebulous".

Opinions, views and research

Ferguson has been referred to as a conservative historian by some commentators and fellow historians. Ferguson himself stated in a 2018 interview on the Rubin Report that his views align to classical liberalism and has referred to himself as a "classic Scottish enlightenment liberal" on other occasions. Some of his research and conclusions have resulted in controversy, particularly from commentators on the left of the political spectrum.

Ferguson endorsed Kemi Badenoch's campaign during the July 2022 Conservative Party leadership election.

World War I
In 1998, Ferguson published The Pity of War: Explaining World War One, which with the help of research assistants he was able to write in just five months. This is an analytic account of what Ferguson considered to be the ten great myths of the Great War. The book generated much controversy, particularly Ferguson's suggestion that it might have proved more beneficial for Europe if Britain had stayed out of the First World War in 1914, thereby allowing Germany to win. 

Ferguson has argued that the British decision to intervene was what stopped a German victory in 1914–15. Furthermore, Ferguson expressed disagreement with the Sonderweg interpretation of German history championed by some German historians such as Fritz Fischer, Hans-Ulrich Wehler, Hans Mommsen and Wolfgang Mommsen, who argued that the German Empire deliberately started an aggressive war in 1914. Likewise, Ferguson has often attacked the work of the German historian Michael Stürmer, who argued that it was Germany's geographical situation in Central Europe that determined the course of German history.

On the contrary, Ferguson maintained that Germany waged a preventive war in 1914, a war largely forced on the Germans by reckless and irresponsible British diplomacy. In particular, Ferguson accused the British Foreign Secretary Sir Edward Grey of maintaining an ambiguous attitude to the question of whether Britain would enter the war or not, and thus confusing Berlin over just what was the British attitude towards the question of intervention in the war. 

Ferguson accused London of unnecessarily allowing a regional war in Europe to escalate into a world war. Moreover, Ferguson denied that the origins of National Socialism could be traced back to Imperial Germany; instead Ferguson asserted the origins of Nazism could only be traced back to the First World War and its aftermath.

Ferguson attacked a number of ideas that he called "myths" in the book. They are listed here (with his counter-arguments in parentheses):
 That Germany was a highly militarist country before 1914 (Ferguson claims Germany was Europe's most anti-militarist country).
 That naval challenges mounted by Germany drove Britain into informal alliances with France and Russia before 1914 (Ferguson claims the British chose alliances with France and Russia as a form of appeasement due to the strength of those nations, and an Anglo-German alliance failed to materialize due to German weakness).
 That British foreign policy was driven by legitimate fears of Germany (Ferguson claims Germany posed no threat to Britain before 1914, and that all British fears of Germany were due to irrational anti-German prejudices).
 That the pre-1914 arms race was consuming ever larger portions of national budgets at an unsustainable rate (Ferguson claims that the only limitations on more military spending before 1914 were political, not economic).
 That World War I was, as Fritz Fischer claimed, a war of aggression on the part of Germany that necessitated British involvement to stop Germany from conquering Europe (Ferguson claims that if Germany had been victorious, something like the European Union would have been created in 1914, and that it would have been for the best if Britain had chosen to opt out of war in 1914).
 That most people were happy with the outbreak of war in 1914 (Ferguson claims that most Europeans were saddened by the coming of war).
 That propaganda was successful in making men wish to fight (Ferguson argues the opposite).
 That the Allies made the best use of their economic resources (Ferguson argues that the Allies "squandered" their economic resources).
 That the British and the French had the better armies (Ferguson claims the German Army was superior).
 That the Allies were more efficient at killing Germans (Ferguson argues that the Germans were more efficient at killing the Allies).
 That most soldiers hated fighting in the war (Ferguson argues most soldiers fought more or less willingly).
 That the British treated German prisoners of war well (Ferguson argues the British routinely killed German POWs).
 That Germany was faced with reparations after 1921 that could not be paid except at ruinous economic cost (Ferguson argues that Germany could easily have paid reparations had there been the political will).

Another controversial aspect of The Pity of War is Ferguson's use of counterfactual history also known as "speculative" or "hypothetical" history. In the book, Ferguson presents a hypothetical version of Europe being, under Imperial German domination, a peaceful, prosperous, democratic continent, without ideologies like communism or Italian fascism. In Ferguson's view, had Germany won World War I, then the lives of millions would have been saved, something like the European Union would have been founded in 1914, and Britain would have remained an empire as well as the world's dominant financial power.

The French historians Stéphane Audoin-Rouzeau and Annette Becker were dubious about much of Ferguson's methodology and conclusions in The Pity of War, but praised him for the chapter dealing with the executions of POWs, arguing that Ferguson had exposed a dark side of the war that until then had been ignored. The American writer Michael Lind wrote about The Pity of War:Like the historian John Charmley, who expressed the same wish in the case of World War II, Ferguson belongs to the fringe element of British conservatism that regrets the absence of a German-British deal in the first half of the 20th century that would have marginalized the United States and might have allowed the British Empire to survive to this day. According to Ferguson, Britain should have stayed out of World War I and allowed Imperial Germany to smash France and Russia and create a continental empire from the Atlantic to the Middle East. The joke is on Ferguson's American conservative admirers, inasmuch as he laments the defeat of the Kaiser's Germany because it accelerated the replacement of the British Empire by the United States of America and the eclipse of the City of London by Wall Street. The German-born American historian Gerhard Weinberg in a review of The Pity of War strongly criticized Ferguson for advancing the thesis that it was idiotic for Britain to have fought a Germany that allegedly posed no danger. Weinberg accused Ferguson of completely ignoring the chief foreign policy aim of Wilhelm II from 1897 onwards, namely Weltpolitik ("World Politics") and argued it was absurd for Ferguson to claim that allowing Germany to defeat France and Russia would have posed no danger to Britain. Weinberg wrote that Ferguson was wrong to claim that Germany's interests were limited only to Europe, and maintained that if the Reich had defeated France in 1914, then Germany would have taken over the French colonies in Asia and Africa which would have definitely affected the balance of power all over the world, not just in Europe. 

Finally, Weinberg attacked Ferguson for claiming that the Tirpitz Plan was not a danger to Britain and that Britain had no reason to fear Germany's naval ambitions, sarcastically asking if that was really the case, then why did the British redeploy so much of their fleet from around the world to the North Sea and spend so much money building warships in the Anglo-German naval arms race? Weinberg accused Ferguson of distorting both German and British history and ignoring any evidence that did not fit with his thesis that Britain should never have fought Germany, stating that The Pity of War was interesting as a historical provocation, but was not persuasive as history.

Rothschilds
Ferguson wrote two volumes about the prominent Rothschild family: The House of Rothschild: Volume 1: Money's Prophets: 1798–1848 and The House of Rothschild: Volume 2: The World's Banker: 1849–1999.  These books were the result of original archival research. The books won the Wadsworth Prize for Business History and were also short-listed for the Jewish Quarterly-Wingate Literary Award and the American National Jewish Book Award.

The books were widely acclaimed by historians, although they did receive some criticism. John Lewis Gaddis, a Cold War–era historian, praised Ferguson's "unrivaled range, productivity and visibility", while criticising the book as unpersuasive and containing contradictory claims. Marxist historian Eric Hobsbawm had praised Ferguson as an excellent historian, but criticised him as a "nostalgist for empire". In a mixed review of a later book by Ferguson, The War of the World: History's Age of Hatred, a reviewer for The Economist described how many regard Ferguson's two books on the Rothschilds "as one of the finest studies of its kind". Jeremy Wormell wrote that while The World's Banker: A History of the House of Rothschild had its virtues, it contained "many errors" which meant it was "unsafe to use it as a source for the debt markets".

Writing in The New York Review of Books, Robert Skidelsky praised Ferguson: "Taken together, Ferguson's two volumes are a stupendous achievement, a triumph of historical research and imagination. No serious historian can write about the connection between the politics, diplomacy, and economics of the nineteenth century in the same way again. And, as any good work of history should do, it constantly prompts us to ask questions about our own age, when once again we have embarked on the grand experiment of a world economy without a world government."

Counterfactual history
Ferguson sometimes champions counterfactual history, also known as "speculative" or "hypothetical" history, and edited a collection of essays, titled Virtual History: Alternatives and Counterfactuals (1997), exploring the subject. Ferguson likes to imagine alternative outcomes as a way of stressing the contingent aspects of history. For Ferguson, great forces don't make history; individuals do, and nothing is predetermined. Thus, for Ferguson, there are no paths in history that will determine how things will work out. The world is neither progressing nor regressing; only the actions of individuals determine whether we will live in a better or worse world. His championing of the method has been controversial within the field. In a 2011 review of Ferguson's book Civilization: The West and the Rest, Noel Malcolm (senior research fellow in history at All Souls College at Oxford University) stated that: "Students may find this an intriguing introduction to a wide range of human history; but they will get an odd idea of how historical argument is to be conducted, if they learn it from this book."

Henry Kissinger
In 2003, former U.S. Secretary of State Henry Kissinger provided Ferguson with access to his White House diaries, letters, and archives for what Ferguson calls a "warts-and-all biography" of Kissinger. In 2015, he published the first volume in a two-part biography titled Kissinger: 1923–1968: The Idealist from Penguin Press.

The thesis of this first volume was that Kissinger was greatly influenced in his academic and political development by the philosopher Immanuel Kant, and especially by an interpretation of Kant that he learned from a mentor at Harvard University, William Yandell Elliott.

British Empire
Ferguson has defended the British Empire, stating, "I think it's hard to make the case, which implicitly the left makes, that somehow the world would have been better off if the Europeans had stayed home." Ferguson is critical of what he calls the "self-flagellation" that he says characterises modern European thought.

Critical views of Ferguson and empire
Historians and commentators have considered his views on this issue and expressed their critical evaluation in various terms, from "audacious" yet "wrong", "informative", "ambitious" and "troubling", to "false and dangerous" apologia. Richard Drayton, Rhodes Professor of Imperial History at King's College London, has stated that it was correct of Seumas Milne to associate "Ferguson with an attempt to "rehabilitate empire" in the service of contemporary great power interests". In November 2011 Pankaj Mishra reviewed Civilisation: The West and the Rest unfavourably in the London Review of Books. Ferguson demanded an apology and threatened to sue Mishra on charges of libel due to allegations of racism.

Jon Wilson, a professor of the Department of History at King's College London, is the author of India Conquered, a 2016 book intended to rebut Ferguson's arguments in Empire: How Britain Made the Modern World, who catalogues the negative elements of the British Raj, and describes the Empire TV program (2003) as "false and dangerous"   Wilson agrees with Ferguson's point that the British innovations brought to India, civil services, education, and railways, had beneficial side effects, but faults them for being done in a spirit of self-interest rather than altruism.

About Ferguson's claim that Britain "made the modern world" by spreading democracy, free trade, capitalism, the rule of law, Protestantism and the English language, Wilson charged that Ferguson never explained precisely how this was done, arguing that the reason was the lack of interest in the history of the people ruled by the British on Ferguson's part, who therefore could not perceive that the interaction between the colonisers and the colonised in places like India, where the population embraced aspects of British culture and rule that were appealing to them while rejecting others that were unappealing. 

Wilson argues that this interaction between the rulers and the ruled is more complex, and contradicts Ferguson's one-sided picture of the British "transforming" India that portrays the British as active and the Indians as passive. Wilson charged that Ferguson failed to look at the empire via non-British eyes because to do so would be to challenge his claim that Britain "made the modern world" by imposing its values on "the Other", and that the history of the empire was far more complicated than the simplistic version that Ferguson is trying to present.

Islam and "Eurabia"
Ferguson has endorsed the work of Bat Ye'or and her Eurabia theory, providing a cover comment for her 2005 Eurabia book, in which he stated that "no writer has done more than Bat Ye'or to draw attention to the menacing character of Islamic extremism. Future historians will one day regard her coinage of the term 'Eurabia' as prophetic."

Matthew Carr wrote in Race & Class that "Niall Ferguson, the conservative English [sic] historian and enthusiastic advocate of a new American empire, has also embraced the Eurabian idea in a widely reproduced article entitled 'Eurabia?', in which he laments the "de-Christianization of Europe" and the secularism of the continent that leaves it "weak in the face of fanaticism"."  Carr adds that "Ferguson sees the recent establishment of a department of Islamic studies in his (Oxford college) as another symptom of 'the creeping Islamicization of a decadent Christendom'," and in a 2004 lecture at the American Enterprise Institute entitled 'The End of Europe?',
Ferguson struck a similarly Spenglerian note, conjuring the term "impire" to depict a process in which a 'political entity, instead of expanding outwards towards its periphery, exporting power, implodes—when the energies come from outside into that entity'. In Ferguson's opinion, this process was already under way in a decadent 'post-Christian' Europe that was drifting inexorably towards the dark denouement of a vanquished civilisation and the fatal embrace of Islam.

In 2015, Ferguson deplored the Paris attacks committed by Islamic State terrorists, but stated he was not going to "stand" with the French as he argued that France was a lost cause, a declining state faced with an unstoppable Islamic wave that would sweep away everything that tried to oppose it. Ferguson compared the modern European Union to the Western Roman Empire, describing modern Europe as not that different from the world depicted by Edward Gibbon in his book The Decline and Fall of the Roman Empire. Ferguson wrote that:Uncannily similar processes are destroying the European Union today...Let us be clear about what is happening. Like the Roman Empire in the early fifth century, Europe has allowed its defenses to crumble. As its wealth has grown, so its military prowess has shrunk, along with its self-belief. It has grown decadent in its shopping malls and sports stadiums. At the same time, it has opened its gates to outsiders who have coveted its wealth without renouncing their ancestral faith. Ferguson wrote the mass influx of refugees into Europe from Syria was a modern version of the Völkerwanderung when the Huns burst out of Asia and invaded Europe, causing millions of the Germanic peoples to flee into the presumed safety of the Roman Empire, smashing their way in as the Romans attempted unsuccessfully to stop the Germans from entering the empire. Ferguson writes that Gibbon was wrong to claim the Roman Empire collapsed slowly and argues that the view among a growing number of modern scholars is that the collapse of the Roman empire was swift and violent; unforeseeable by Romans of the day, just as the collapse of modern European civilization would likewise be for modern Europeans.

In 2017, Ferguson opined that the West had insufficiently heeded the rise of militant Islam and its global consequences in the same way it failed to predict that the rise of Lenin would lead to the further spread of communism and conflict around the world:Ask yourself how effectively we in the West have responded to the rise of militant Islam since the Iranian Revolution unleashed its Shi’ite variant and since 9/11 revealed the even more aggressive character of Sunni Islamism. I fear we have done no better than our grandfathers did.

Foreign intervention—the millions of dollars that have found their way from the Gulf to radical mosques and Islamic centres in the West.

Incompetent liberals—the proponents of multiculturalism who brand any opponent of jihad an "Islamophobe". Clueless bankers—the sort who fall over themselves to offer "sharia-compliant" loans and bonds. Fellow travellers—the leftists who line up with the Muslim Brotherhood to castigate Israel at every opportunity. And the faint-hearted—those who were so quick to pull out of Iraq in 2009 that they allowed the rump of al-Qaeda to morph into Isis.

A century ago it was the West's great blunder to think it would not matter if Lenin and his confederates took over the Russian Empire, despite their stated intention to plot world revolution and overthrow both democracy and capitalism. Incredible as it may seem, I believe we are capable of repeating that catastrophic error. I fear that, one day, we shall wake with a start to discover that the Islamists have repeated the Bolshevik achievement, which was to acquire the resources and capability to threaten our existence.

During a 2018 debate, Ferguson asserted that he is not anti-immigration or opposed to Muslims, but felt that sections of Europe's political and intellectual classes had failed to predict the cultural and political consequences of large scale immigration. He stated that Islam differs from Judaism and Christianity through being "designed differently" as a political ideology that does not recognize the separation of mosque with the secular and temporal, and that the Muslim world has mostly followed an opposite trend to Western society by becoming less secularized and more literal in interpreting holy scripture.

He concluded that if Europe kept pursuing large scale migration from pious Muslim societies combined with poor structures of economic and cultural integration, especially in an era when existing migrant communities are either unassimilated or loosely integrated into the host society, it is "highly likely" that networks of fundamentalist dawah will grow in which Islamic extremists draw in the culturally and economically unassimilated Muslims of immigrant backgrounds. Ferguson has pointed out that even when living in Western nations, both he and his wife Ayaan Hirsi Ali have to live with permanent security measures as a result of her public critiques of Islam and status as a former Muslim.

Iraq War
Ferguson supported the 2003 Iraq War, and he is on record as being not necessarily opposed to future western incursions around the world. It's all very well for us to sit here in the West with our high incomes and cushy lives, and say it's immoral to violate the sovereignty of another state. But if the effect of that is to bring people in that country economic and political freedom, to raise their standard of living, to increase their life expectancy, then don't rule it out.

Donald Trump
Ferguson was initially skeptical of Donald Trump's bid for the 2016 United States presidential election. During the Republican Party primaries, Ferguson was quoted in early 2016: "If you bother to read some of the serious analysis of Trump's support, you realize that it's a very fragile thing and highly unlikely to deliver what he needs in the crucial first phase of the primaries ... By the time we get to March–April, it's all over. I think there's going to be a wonderful catharsis, I'm really looking forward to it: Trump's humiliation. Bring it on." Trump eventually won the nomination.

Three weeks before the 2016 United States presidential election, after the Access Hollywood tape scandal, Ferguson stated in an interview that it "was over for Donald Trump"; that "Trump had flamed out in all three Presidential debates"; that, "I don't think there can be any last minute surprise to rescue him [Trump]"; that there was no hope of Donald Trump winning Independent voters and that Trump was "gone as a candidate", adding that "it seems to me clear that she [Hillary Clinton] is going to be the first female President of the United States. The only question is how bad does his [Trump's] flaming out affect candidates for the Senate, candidates for the House, further down on the ballot." 

After Brexit, Ferguson stated that Trump could win via the Electoral College if certain demographics turned out to vote in key swing states. Trump was elected president and the Republican Party retained control of both the Senate and House of Representatives.

In 2018, Ferguson argued that a Hillary Clinton presidency would have been more disruptive to America, and that Clinton would have been "immediately" impeached as Trump supporters would have likely believed that the election was rigged. Ferguson stated that he regarded himself "in the middle ground" in a generally polarized public and media opinion on Trump's presidency. He elaborated that while he found Trump's personality "pretty hard to take", he cited several positive achievements undertaken by his administration, including America's stronger economic performance and noted that he found Trump's foreign policy stances on China, North Korea and the Middle East an improvement over that of the Obama administration. He further opined that the media was more focused on Trump's behaviour on social media than the "competent job" being done by members of his administration. 

In 2019, he wrote an op-ed in The New York Times arguing that the China–United States trade war was the beginning of a Second Cold War between the United States and China, and that despite the risks of the showdown the introduction of an external enemy similar to the Soviet Union could prove beneficial by reducing political polarization in the United States.

During the 2020 United States Presidential election, Ferguson noted that contrary to arguments from Trump's opponents that he only appealed to older White men, statistics showed his support among Black and Latino voters had risen. He opined that Biden was likely to win the presidency, but that the Democratic Party would not see a "blue wave" of support as it had tried to turn the election into "a referendum on Trump's handling of COVID-19" when there "hasn't been anything exceptionally bad about American performance" and the Democrats had misjudged the mood of voters concerned about law and order following the Black Lives Matter protests. After the election was concluded, Ferguson stated that both Trump and the "far-left of the Democratic Party" had lost.

Ferguson criticized the 2021 U.S Capitol attack committed by supporters of Trump, arguing on Twitter that the participants should be prosecuted and that Trump's behavior had cost the Republicans the Senate. He argued that Trumpism was likely to remain a force within US politics and likened it to Jacobite Pretenders who sought to revolt in order to restore the House of Stuart to the British royal throne after the Glorious Revolution.

Trump's "New World Order"
In an article from November 2016 in The Boston Globe, Ferguson advised that Trump should support the efforts of the Prime Minister, Theresa May to have the UK leave the European Union as the best way of breaking up the EU, and sign a free trade agreement with the United Kingdom once Brexit is complete. To stabilise international relations, Ferguson speculated that Trump could give recognition to Russia as a Great Power, and work with President Vladimir Putin by giving Russia a sphere of influence in Eurasia. In the same column, Ferguson advised Trump not to engage in a trade war with China, and work with President Xi Jinping to create a US-Chinese partnership. 

Ferguson argued that Trump and Putin could work for the victory of Marine Le Pen (who wants France to leave the EU) and the Front national in the 2017 French elections, arguing that Le Pen was the French politician most congenial to the Trump administration. Ferguson argued that a quintumvirate of Trump, Putin, Xi, May and Le Pen could then result in a stable "world order" that would reduce the likelihood of international conflict.

Economic policy
In its edition of 15 August 2005, The New Republic published "The New New Deal", an essay by Ferguson and Laurence J. Kotlikoff, a professor of economics at Boston University. The two scholars called for the following changes to the American government's fiscal and income security policies:
 Replacing the personal income tax, corporate income tax, Federal Insurance Contributions Act tax (FICA), estate tax, and gift tax with a 33% Federal Retail Sales Tax (FRST), plus a monthly rebate, amounting to the amount of FRST that a household with similar demographics would pay if its income were at the poverty line. See also: FairTax
 Replacing the old age benefits paid under Social Security with a Personal Security System, consisting of private retirement accounts for all citizens, plus a government benefit payable to those whose savings were insufficient to afford a minimum retirement income
 Replacing Medicare and Medicaid with a universal Medical Security System that would provide health insurance vouchers to all citizens, the value of which would be determined by one's health
 Cutting federal discretionary spending by 20%

In February 2010, during the Greek government-debt crisis, Ferguson appeared on the Glenn Beck Program predicting that if interest rates rose in the United States it could experience a similar sovereign default and mass civil disorder to what was occurring in Greece. He also praised the Tea Party movement. Later in the year he called for the Federal Reserve under Chairman Ben Bernanke to end its second round of quantitative easing.

In November 2012, Ferguson stated in a video with CNN that the U.S. has enough energy resources to move towards energy independence and could possibly enter a new economic golden age due to the related socio-economic growth—coming out of the post-world economic recession doldrums.

Ferguson was an attendee of the 2012 Bilderberg Group meeting, where he was a speaker on economic policy.

Ferguson was highly critical of Britain's vote to leave the European Union, warning that "the economic consequences will be dire". Later, after backing the Remain campaign during the referendum, Ferguson changed his mind and came out in support of Britain's exit from the EU.

Exchanges with Paul Krugman
In May 2009, Ferguson became involved in a high-profile exchange of views with economist Paul Krugman arising out of a panel discussion hosted by PEN/New York Review on 30 April 2009, regarding the U.S. economy. Ferguson contended that the Obama administration's policies are simultaneously Keynesian and monetarist, in an "incoherent" mix, and specifically claimed that the government's issuance of a multitude of new bonds would cause an increase in interest rates.

Krugman argued that Ferguson's view is "resurrecting 75-year old fallacies" and full of "basic errors". He also stated that Ferguson is a "poseur" who "hasn't bothered to understand the basics, relying on snide comments and surface cleverness to convey the impression of wisdom. It's all style, no comprehension of substance."

In 2012, Jonathan Portes, the director of the National Institute of Economic and Social Research, said that subsequent events had shown Ferguson to be wrong: "As we all know, since then both the US and UK have had deficits running at historically extremely high levels, and long-term interest rates at historic lows: as Krugman has repeatedly pointed out, the (IS-LM) textbook has been spot on."

Later in 2012, after Ferguson wrote a cover story for Newsweek arguing that Mitt Romney should be elected in the upcoming US presidential election, Krugman wrote that there were multiple errors and misrepresentations in the story, concluding "We're not talking about ideology or even economic analysis here—just a plain misrepresentation of the facts, with an august publication letting itself be used to misinform readers. The Times would require an abject correction if something like that slipped through. Will Newsweek?" 

Ferguson denied that he had misrepresented the facts in an online rebuttal. Matthew O'Brien countered that Ferguson was still distorting the meaning of the Congressional Budget Office report being discussed, and that the entire piece could be read as an effort to deceive.

In 2013, Ferguson, naming Dean Baker, Josh Barro, Brad DeLong, Matthew O'Brien, Noah Smith, Matthew Yglesias and Justin Wolfers, attacked "Krugman and his acolytes," in his three-part essay on why he dislikes Paul Krugman.  The essay title ('Krugtron the Invincible') originally comes from a post by Noah Smith.

Remarks on Keynes' sexual orientation
At a May 2013 investment conference in Carlsbad, California, Ferguson was asked about his views on economist John Maynard Keynes' quotation that "in the long run we are all dead." Ferguson stated that Keynes was indifferent to the future because he was gay and did not have children. The remarks were widely criticised for being offensive, factually inaccurate, and a distortion of Keynes' ideas.

Ferguson posted an apology for these statements shortly after reports of his words were widely disseminated, saying his comments were "as stupid as they were insensitive". In the apology, Ferguson stated: "My disagreements with Keynes's economic philosophy have never had anything to do with his sexual orientation. It is simply false to suggest, as I did, that his approach to economic policy was inspired by any aspect of his personal life."

Stanford Cardinal Conversations
In spring 2018, Ferguson was involved with College Republican leaders at Stanford to oppose a left-leaning student take over of the Cardinal Conversations initiative. In leaked emails, he was quoted as asking for opposition research on the student involved. He later apologized and resigned from the said initiative when emails were leaked revealing his involvement in the events. "I very much regret the publication of these emails. I also regret having written them," Ferguson wrote in a statement to The Daily.

Cryptocurrency
Ferguson was an early skeptic of cryptocurrencies, famously dismissing his teenage son's recommendation to buy Bitcoin in 2014. By 2017, he had changed his mind on Bitcoin's utility, saying it had established itself as a form of "digital gold: a store of value for wealthy investors, especially those located in countries with weak rule of law and high political risk." In February 2019, Ferguson became an advisor for digital asset protocol firm Ampleforth Protocol, saying he was attracted by the firm's plan to "reinvent money in a way that protects individual freedom and to create a payments system that treats everyone equally". In March 2019, Ferguson spoke at an Australian Financial Review Business Summit, where he admitted to being "wrong to think there was no ... use for a form of currency based on blockchain technology... I don't think this will turn out to be a complete delusion."

Scottish nationalism and the British Union
Ferguson has stated that he identified as a Scottish nationalist as a teenager, but moderated his views after moving to England to study history. He has argued that Scottish nationalism is sometimes fueled by a distorted view that Scots have always been oppressed by the English and is misconceived by people from outside of the United Kingdom as the choice between being Scottish or English. Ferguson states that in contrast to the subjugations of Wales and Ireland, Scotland was united as an "equal" country to England during the Act of Union, and cites events such as King James VI of Scotland inheriting the English crown, the failed Darien scheme to colonize Panama which prompted Scottish political elites to support the Union and that Scots were an integral part of the East India Company to question the narrative that Scotland was oppressed. Ferguson has also argued (citing Walter Scott's Waverley) that Scotland after the Jacobite rebellion remained a land divided by warring clans and religious factions, and that the Union helped to quell some of the conflicts.

During the 2014 Scottish independence referendum, Ferguson supported Scotland remaining within the United Kingdom, citing potential economic consequences of Scottish independence, but argued that the No campaign needed to focus on Scotland's history of cosmopolitanism as well as economic points to save the Union. In 2021, ahead of the 2021 Scottish Parliament election, Ferguson argued that the Labour administration under Tony Blair had made a mistake in believing devolution would stem Scottish nationalism, but instead it enabled the Scottish National Party to assume regional power and criticised the SNP government of Nicola Sturgeon for its management of the Scottish economy, education and freedom of speech. Ferguson furthermore claimed that the best way for the British government to thwart independence and the SNP's separationist demands was not by "unthinkingly accepting the SNP's argument that it has a moral right to a referendum on secession every time it wins a parliamentary election" and allowing a slim Yes vote to decide the outcome, but instead by following the example of Canadian Prime Minister Jean Chretien and minister Stephane Dion's who handled the Parti Quebecois's calls for Quebec secessionism by taking the matter to the Canadian Supreme Court and introducing the Clarity Act rather than letting it solely be up to "a slim majority of the voters of Quebec if Canada broke up."

European Union
In 2011, Ferguson predicted that Grexit (the notion of Greece leaving the Euro currency) was unlikely to happen, but that Britain would leave the European Union in the near future as it would be easier for Britain to leave the EU owing to the fact it was not part of the Eurozone and that returning to a national currency would be harder for countries who had signed up to a single currency. In 2012, he described the Eurozone as a "disaster waiting to happen".

During the 2016 United Kingdom European Union membership referendum, Ferguson was initially critical of the idea of Britain leaving the EU despite his criticisms of the latter, warning that "the economic consequences will be dire" and endorsed a Remain vote. However, after backing the Remain campaign, Ferguson changed his stance and came out in support of Brexit, admitting that his support to stay in had been motivated in part on a personal level by not wanting the government of David Cameron (with whom he had a friendship) to collapse and in turn risk Jeremy Corbyn becoming Prime Minister. Ferguson elaborated that while Brexit would still have some economic consequences, the EU had been a "disaster" on its monetary, immigration, national security and radical Islam policies. He also added that "one has to recognise that the European elite's performances over the last decade entirely justified the revolt of provincial England."

In 2020, Ferguson predicted that the EU is destined to become "moribund" and was at risk of collapse in the near future and that the single currency had only benefited Northern Europe and Germany in particular while causing economic havoc in Southern Europe. However, he also argued the "real disintegration of Europe" will happen over the EU's migration policies that have both exacerbated and failed to provide solutions to illegal immigration to the European continent from North Africa and the Middle East. Ferguson stated that high levels of illegal immigration from Muslim-majority nations would in turn further the rise of populist and eurosceptic movements committed to rolling back or leaving the European Union. Ferguson also predicted that in a decade's time, Britain would question why there had been fuss, outcry or debates over the manner of how to leave the EU over Brexit because "we'll have left something that was essentially disintegrating" and that "it would be a little bit like getting a divorce and then your ex drops dead, and you spent all that money on the divorce courts, if only you'd known how sick the ex was. The European Union is sick, and people don't really want to admit that, least of all in Brussels."

When commenting on the ethnic diversity of the candidates for the July–September 2022 Conservative Party leadership election, Ferguson disputed that racism or nostalgia for the British Empire had played a significant role in the vote for Brexit.

COVID-19 pandemic 
Ferguson, drawing on his research of the 1881–1896 cholera pandemic and the Spanish flu, began predicting that the COVID-19 pandemic would have a severe impact on the world in January 2020. He later criticized both the British and U.S. federal government responses to the COVID-19 pandemic as inadequate, calling them "both, in their different ways, intelligible only as colossal failures by governments to make adequate preparations for a disaster they always knew to be a likely contingency". 

However, he also dismissed the idea that right-wing populism had been responsible for failure of government responses to the pandemic, accusing liberal politicians such as Belgian Prime Minister Sophie Wilmès and U.S. President Joe Biden of making similar mistakes to U.S. President Donald Trump and British Prime Minister Boris Johnson. He reflected in a 2021 podcast interview with Lex Fridman that many of the failures in the United States had been systemic rather than the personal fault of Donald Trump, and that Trump was unfairly blamed because of the Trump administration's messaging. He alleged that President Barack Obama's handling of the U.S. opioid epidemic had been similarly costly but more obscure. Ferguson also praised Operation Warp Speed, and claimed that part of the reason for the failure of the U.S. government to effectively respond to the pandemic was the absence of a similar program for COVID-19 testing.

2022 Russian invasion of Ukraine 
On 22 March 2022, Ferguson wrote: "I conclude that the U.S. intends to keep this war going. The administration will continue to supply the Ukrainians with anti-aircraft Stingers, antitank Javelins and explosive Switchblade drones. ...  It helps explain, among other things, the lack of any diplomatic effort by the U.S. to secure a cease-fire. ... Prolonging the war runs the risk not just of leaving tens of thousands of Ukrainians dead and millions homeless, but also of handing Putin something that he can plausibly present at home as victory." He also criticized the political rally held in Moscow for justifying the invasion and described it as "fascistic".

Personal life

Ferguson married journalist Sue Douglas in 1994 after meeting her in 1987 when she was his editor at The Sunday Times. They have three children: Felix, Freya, and Lachlan.

In February 2010, Ferguson separated from Douglas and started dating Ayaan Hirsi Ali. Ferguson and Douglas divorced in 2011.  Ferguson married Hirsi Ali on 10 September 2011 and Hirsi Ali gave birth to their son Thomas in December 2011. In an interview in April 2011, Ferguson complained about the media coverage of his relationship with Ali, stating: "No, I never read their shitty coverage of people's private lives. I don't care about the sex lives of celebrities, so I was a little unprepared for having my private life all over the country. So yeah, I was naive, yeah."

Ferguson dedicated his book Civilization to "Ayaan". In an interview with The Guardian, Ferguson spoke about his love for Ali, whom, he writes in the preface, "understands better than anyone I know what Western civilisation really means – and what it still has to offer the world".

Ferguson's self-confessed workaholism has placed strains on his personal relations in the past. Ferguson has commented that:
[F]rom 2002, the combination of making TV programmes and teaching at Harvard took me away from my children too much. You don't get those years back. You have to ask yourself: "Was it a smart decision to do those things?" I think the success I have enjoyed since then has been bought at a significant price. In hindsight, there would have been a bunch of things that I would have said no to. In an interview, Ferguson described his relationship with the left: "No, they love being provoked by me! Honestly, it makes them feel so much better about their lives to think that I'm a reactionary; it's a substitute for thought. "Imperialist scumbag" and all that. Oh dear, we're back in a 1980s student union debate."

Ferguson was the inspiration for Alan Bennett's play The History Boys (2004), particularly the character of Irwin, a history teacher who urges his pupils to find a counterintuitive angle, and goes on to become a television historian. Bennett's character "Irwin", writes David Smith of The Observer, gives the impression that "an entire career can be built on the trick of contrariness".

In 2018, Ferguson became naturalised as a US citizen.

Selected bibliography

 American edition.

 American ed. has the title: The war of the World: Twentieth-century Conflict and the Descent of the West  (also a Channel 4 series)

See also
 Anglosphere

References

Notes

General references
 
 
 "The Ascent of Money", Royal Society for the Encouragement of Arts, Manufactures and Commerce
 "Audio: Niall Ferguson in conversation", The Forum, BBC World Service
 Hans Koning, "Still Not Over Over There?" , The Nation, August 1999 – Review of The Pity of War
 Martin Rubin, "A Banker to the Rescue", WSJ.com, 26 June 2010
 Liaquat Ahamed, "Yesterday's Banker", NYTimes.com, 30 July 2010
 "The Sun Sets in the West", Oxonian Review, 4 April 2011 – Review of Civilization
 "An Interview with Niall Ferguson", Oxonian Review, 9 April 2011
 "Niall Ferguson and the brain-dead American right", 24 May 2011

External links

 
 
 
 
 

1964 births
Living people
People educated at the Glasgow Academy
Political science writers
Alumni of Magdalen College, Oxford
21st-century Scottish historians
British foreign policy writers
Conservatism in the United Kingdom
Economics writers
Fellows of Jesus College, Oxford
Fellows of Christ's College, Cambridge
Fellows of Peterhouse, Cambridge
Harvard Business School faculty
Harvard University faculty
New York University Stern School of Business faculty
Writers from Glasgow
Right-wing politics in the United Kingdom
British critics of Islam
Scottish emigrants to the United States
Historians of World War I
Historians of World War II
Historians of the British Empire
British expatriate academics in the United States
Theorists on Western civilization
Economic historians
Eurabia
Member of the Mont Pelerin Society
World historians